A latent variable model is a statistical model that relates a set of observable variables (also called manifest variables or indicators) to a set of latent variables.

It is assumed that the responses on the indicators or manifest variables are the result of an individual's position on the latent variable(s), and that the manifest variables have nothing in common after controlling for the latent variable (local independence).

Different types of the latent variable models can be grouped according to whether the manifest and latent variables are categorical or continuous:

The Rasch model represents the simplest form of item response theory.  Mixture models are central to latent profile analysis.

In factor analysis and latent trait analysis the latent variables are treated  as continuous normally distributed variables, and in latent profile analysis  and latent class analysis as from a multinomial distribution.  The manifest variables in factor analysis and latent profile analysis  are continuous and in most cases, their conditional distribution given the latent variables  is assumed to be normal. In latent trait analysis and latent class analysis,  the manifest variables are discrete. These variables could be dichotomous, ordinal or nominal variables.  Their conditional distributions are assumed to be binomial or multinomial.

Because the distribution of a continuous latent variable can be approximated by a discrete distribution,  the distinction between continuous and discrete variables turns out not to be fundamental at all. Therefore, there may be a psychometrical latent variable, but not a psychological psychometric variable.

See also
 Confirmatory factor analysis
 Hidden Markov model
 Partial least squares path modeling
 Structural equation modeling

Notes

References

Further reading 
 

 Latent variable model